Mimi is a feminine given name and a shorter form (hypocorism) of the given names Miriam, Emilia or Naomi.

A–G
 Mimi Aguglia (1884–1970), Italian actress
 Mimi Ajzenstadt (born 1956), Israeli criminologist; President of the Open University of Israel
 Mimí Ardú (born 1956), Argentinian actress
 Mimi Benzell (1924–1970), American soprano
 Mimi Berdal (born 1950), Norwegian lawyer and businessperson
 Maria Francisca Bia (1809–1889), Dutch actress called Mimi
 Mimi Cazort (1930–2014), Canadian gallery curator and author
 Mimi Chakib (1913–1983), Egyptian actress
 Mimi Chakraborty (born 1989), Bengali film and television actress
 Mimi Coertse (born 1932), South African operatic soprano
 Mimi Dietrich, American quilter and writer
 Mimi Fariña (1945–2001), American singer-songwriter, sister of Joan Baez
Mimi Fawaz, Nigerian-Lebanese journalist
 Mimi Fox, American jazz guitarist
 Mimi Freedman, American documentary filmmaker
 Mimi Gardner Gates (born c. 1943), American art historian
 Mimi Gianopulos, American actress
 Mimi Gibson (born 1948), American former child actress
 Mimi Goese, American musician, former vocalist for the band Hugo Largo
 Mimi Gross (born 1940), American artist
 Mimi Gurbst, American television news producer

H–M
 Mimi Haas, American billionaire businesswoman
 Mimi Heinrich (born 1936), Danish actress and writer
 Mimi Hines (born 1933), American singer and comedian
 Mimi Hughes, American long-distance swimmer
 Mimi Jakobsen (born 1948), Danish politician
 Mimi Johnson, American arts administrator
 Mimi Jung (born 1993), South Korean singer and member of girl group Gugudan
 Mimi Jung (born 1981), South Korean artist
 Mimi Kagan (1918–1999), Russia-born American modern dancer, choreographer
 Mimi Karlsen (born 1957), Greenlandic politician
 Mimi Keene (born 1998), English actress
 Mimi Kennedy (born 1949), American actress
 Mimi Khalvati (born 1944), British poet
 Mimi Kodheli (born 1964), Albanian politician
 Mimi Kopperud Slevigen (born 1977), Norwegian handball player
 Mimi Kuzyk (born 1952), Canadian actress
 Mimi LaFollette Summerskill (1917–2008), American educator, author, political activist and vintner
 Mimi Lamote (born 1964), Belgian businesswoman
 Mimí Lazo (born 1954), Venezuelan actress and producer
 Mimi Leahey, American television script writer
 Mimi Leder (born 1952), American film director
 Mimi Lerner (1945–2007), Polish-American mezzo-soprano and voice teacher
 Mimi Lozano (born 1933), American activist for Hispanic rights
 Mimi Macpherson (born 1967), Australian businesswoman and environmentalist, sister of Elle Macpherson
 Mimi Marks (born 1967), American transsexual entertainer
 Mimi Maynard, American television and voice actress
 Mimi Michaels (born 1983), American actress
 Mimi Miyagi (born 1973), American adult film actress

N–Z
 Mimi Ndiweni (born 1991), British-Zimbabwean actress 
 Mimi Nelson (1922–1999), Swedish film actress
 Mimi Page (born 1987), American singer-songwriter, composer
 Mimi Parent (1924–2005), Canadian artist
 Mimi Parker, drummer and singer for the band Low
 Mimi Perrin (born 1926), French jazz musician
 Mimi Pollak (1903–1999), Swedish actress and theatre director
 Mimi Pond, American writer and cartoonist
 Mimi Reisel Gladstein (born 1936), American professor of English
 Mimi Rogers (born 1956), American actress
 Mimi Saric (born 1983), Australian football (soccer) player
 Mimi von Schleinitz (1842–1912), Berlin salonnière
 Mimi Schmir, American television producer and screenwriter
 Mimi Sheller (born 1967), American sociologist
 Mimi Sheraton (born 1926), American food critic
 Mimi Slinger (born 2003), English actress
 Mimi Smith (1903–1992), John Lennon's maternal aunt and guardian
 Mimi Sodré (1892–1982), Brazilian football (soccer) player
 Mimi Stillman (born 1982), American classical flutist
 Mimi Tran (born 1960), Vietnamese-American professional poker player
 Mimi Umidon, American actress, presenter of the Magic Bullet blender
 Mimi Webb (born 2000), English singer-songwriter
 Mimi Walters (born 1962), Republican state senator from California
 Mimi Weddell (1915–2009), American actress
 Mimi Woods, American voice actress

Nicknames, stage names, and code names
 Mimi, the code name for Yvonne Fontaine (1913–1996), a member of the French Resistance working with the Special Operations Executive
 Mimi, nickname of American R&B musician Mariah Carey, source of the title of her 2005 album The Emancipation of Mimi
 Mimi, stage name of South Korean singer Kim Mi-hyun (born 1995) of girl group Oh My Girl
 Mimí, stage name of Mexican singer Irma Angélica Hernández Ochoa (born 1962) of the pop music group Flans
 Mimi, nickname of Iraqi footballer Mohanad Ali (born 2000)
 Mimi Wong, stage name of bar hostess Wong Weng Siu (1939–1973), who was executed for murder in Singapore

Mythological and fictional characters
 Mimi (folklore), a fairy-like being in the mythology of Northern Aboriginal Australians
 Mimi, one of the mascots of the Pop'n Music video game series
 Mimì (La bohème), the leading female role in the opera La bohème
 Mimi, a cartoon character featured in Muse (magazine)
 Mimi, a character from the game Super Paper Mario
 Mimi Balguerie, a character in the light novel series Ro-Kyu-Bu! by Sagu Aoyama
 Mimi Bobeck, a character from The Drew Carey Show played by Kathy Kinney
 Mimi Clark, a character in the television series Jericho
 Mimi Glossop, character played by Ginger Rogers in the 1934 film The Gay Divorcee
 Mimi Kanassis, supporting character from Unbreakable Kimmy Schmidt
 Mimi Labonq, a character in the BBC sitcom Allo 'Allo!
 Mimi Lockhart, a character in Days of our Lives
 Mimi Marquez, a character in Rent, a musical based on La bohème
 Mimi Mortin, the main character of the Canadian animated television series What about Mimi?
 Mimi Tachikawa, a character from the Japanese anime Digimon
 Mimi Tasogare, a character from the Japanese anime Duel Masters
 Mimi the dog, a character in 1976 Mexican comedy El Miedo no anda en Burro
 Mimi Usa, a character in Kodomo no Jikan
 Mimi Force, a character in Blue Bloods (novel series)
 Mimi, a anthropomorphic macaw in the 2014 3D computer-animated sequel film Rio 2, voiced by Rita Moreno
 Character in Mimi (2014 TV series) from South Korea
 Mimi, a heroine character in Space Sheriff Gavan
 Princess Mimi, an alien princess character in the Japanese children's manga series Cyborg Kuro-chan
 Mimi, a cat character in Japanese short animation She and Her Cat
 Mimi, a character from the 1997 Peanuts special, It Was My Best Birthday Ever, Charlie Brown

Feminine given names
Hypocorisms